Adelboden is a mountain village and a municipality in Switzerland, located in the Frutigen-Niedersimmental administrative district in the Bernese Highlands.

Geography

Adelboden lies in the west of the Bernese Highlands, at the end of the valley of the river Entschlige (High German: Engstlige), which flows in Frutigen into the Kander.

Adelboden is a traditional Swiss mountain village on a terrace looking south to the Engstligen waterfalls. Also part of the village are the inhabited valleys of Gilbach, Stigelschwand, Boden, Hirzboden, and Ausserschwand.

The vegetation is alpine and sub-alpine, partially wooded, the slopes, the plateaus, and terraces usually alp meadows.

The most salient mountains are Lohner, Steghorn, Wildstrubel, Fitzer, Tschenten (mountain railway), Albristhorn and Gsür.

Of this area,  or 41.4% is used for agricultural purposes, while  or 18.2% is forested.

Of the built up area, housing and buildings made up 1.5% and transportation infrastructure made up 0.8%. Out of the forested land, 14.4% of the total land area is heavily forested and 3.0% is covered with orchards or small clusters of trees. Of the agricultural land, 8.5% is pastures and 32.9% is used for alpine pastures. All the water in the municipality is flowing water. Of the unproductive areas, 9.6% is unproductive vegetation, 25.6% is too rocky for vegetation and 1.1% of the land is covered by glaciers.

On 31 December 2009 Amtsbezirk Frutigen, the municipality's former district, was dissolved. On the following day, 1 January 2010, it joined the newly created Verwaltungskreis Frutigen-Niedersimmental.

Coat of arms
The blazon of the municipal coat of arms is Argent on a Mount Vert an Eagle displayed Sable beaked, langued and membered Gules.

History

Adelboden is first mentioned  in 1409 as in valle Adelboden.  In 1453, it was mentioned as Adelboden alias silva.

The alps Engstligenalp and Silleren belonging to Adelboden are mentioned for the first time in the 13th century. The inhabitants of Engstligental are called forest people. In the 15th century Adelboden got its own church and there were over 50 house fathers vouching for the salary of the minister.

In the 16th century, when Adelboden joined the Reformation, the Catholic priest fled over the Hahnenmoospass to the Catholic Canton of Fribourg.

Up to the 19th century, the only way to Frutigen was high on the south slope of the Engstligen Valley and often impassable in winter. In the late 19th century a road along the river Entschlige was built joining Adelboden to the rest of the world.

In the 1870s the first boarding house was opened by one of the local teachers. It developed into a hotel, which is still in the possession of the same family (hotel Hari im Schlegeli). Around the turn of the century tourism led to a big increase in the population.

Adelboden was the destination of the first packaged winter sports holidays (vacations), organised by Sir Henry Lunn in 1903.

Into the 1930s the aerial ropeway to the Engstligenalp was built with further ropeways following. The Silleren area was up into the 1980s accessible by buses.

Main sights and cultural events

Engstligen Falls: the river Entschlige falls  over rocks into the depth and forms one of the most impressive waterfalls in the Bernese Highlands. Very impressive is the "Alpaufzug" when 350 cows are driven upward on the narrow seam path through the cliff to the summer pasture on the Engstligenalp in early summer.
Engstligenalp: plateau at  elevation
The town's church, with early-20th-century glassworks by Augusto Giacometti.
Our Chalet – A Guiding world centre and an international meeting place for Girl Guides and Girl Scouts.

Cultural events include:
 World Cup Men's alpine ski races (January)
 the men's giant slalom course is one of the most challenging on the World Cup circuit.
 Vogellisi-Festival (Live music, July)
 Vogellisi Lauf (Mountain running race in July)
 Kammermusic-festival (Chamber music, July)
 Langlauf night – every 30 December – Cross Country races on the main street of town

Demographics

, 6.9% of the population are resident foreign nationals. Over the last 10 years (2000–2010) the population has changed at a rate of −0.2%. Migration accounted for −1.2%, while births and deaths accounted for 2.2%.

Most of the population speaks German (3,453 or 95.0%) as their first language, Serbo-Croatian is the second most common (36 or 1.0%) and Portuguese is the third (34 or 0.9%).  There are 29 people who speak French, 17 people who speak Italian and 6 people who speak Romansh.

, the population was 49.1% male and 50.9% female.  The population was made up of 1,618 Swiss men (45.4% of the population) and 133 (3.7%) non-Swiss men.  There were 1,699 Swiss women (47.7%) and 113 (3.2%) non-Swiss women. Of the population in the municipality, 2,124 or about 58.4% were born in Adelboden and lived there in 2000.  There were 666 or 18.3% who were born in the same canton, while 365 or 10.0% were born somewhere else in Switzerland, and 290 or 8.0% were born outside of Switzerland.

, children and teenagers (0–19 years old) make up 23.6% of the population, while adults (20–64 years old) make up 56.6% and seniors (over 64 years old) make up 19.8%.

, there were 1,600 people who were single and never married in the municipality.  There were 1,771 married individuals, 204 widows or widowers and 59 individuals who are divorced.

, there were 478 households that consist of only one person and 152 households with five or more people.  , a total of 1,347 apartments (41.8% of the total) were permanently occupied, while 1,722 apartments (53.4%) were seasonally occupied and 154 apartments (4.8%) were empty.  , the construction rate of new housing units was 5.3 new units per 1000 residents. The vacancy rate for the municipality, was 0.06%.

The historical population is given in the following chart:

Languages
The language is Adelbodnertütsch, which belongs to the Berner Oberland dialects with some loans from Valais dialects and belongs to the Highest Alemannic language group.

Most of the population speaks German (95.0%), with Serbo-Croat the second most common ( 1.0%),and Portuguese third ( 0.9%).

Government
Legislation is adopted by the biannual general assembly. Executive is the local council with nine members, all of whom are honorary.

In the 2011 federal election the most popular party was the Swiss People's Party (SVP) which received 41.7% of the vote.  The next three most popular parties were the Federal Democratic Union of Switzerland (EDU) (20%), the Conservative Democratic Party (BDP) (10.4%) and the Evangelical People's Party (EVP) (9%).  In the federal election, a total of 1,673 votes were cast, and the voter turnout was 61.4%.

Economics
Adelboden has a mixture of agriculture, local industry (wood building companies, mineral water source) and tourism. People work in tourism, (approximately 490 persons), other services (approx. 500 persons), construction industry (approx. 310 persons), automobile industry (approx. 30 persons), mineral water source (approx. 45 persons) and agriculture (full-time approx. 45 persons), taxidermy (full-time approx. 16 persons).

, Adelboden had an unemployment rate of 1.29%.  , there were a total of 2,084 people employed in the municipality.  Of these, there were 366 people employed in the primary economic sector and about 133 businesses involved in this sector.  617 people were employed in the secondary sector and there were 57 businesses in this sector.  1,101 people were employed in the tertiary sector, with 150 businesses in this sector. There were 1,833 residents of the municipality who were employed in some capacity, of which females made up 40.5% of the workforce.

 there were a total of 1,675 full-time equivalent jobs.  The number of jobs in the primary sector was 192, all of which were in agriculture.  The number of jobs in the secondary sector was 580 of which 88 or (15.2%) were in manufacturing and 450 (77.6%) were in construction.  The number of jobs in the tertiary sector was 903.  In the tertiary sector; 214 or 23.7% were in wholesale or retail sales or the repair of motor vehicles, 123 or 13.6% were in the movement and storage of goods, 370 or 41.0% were in a hotel or restaurant, 12 or 1.3% were in the information industry, 12 or 1.3% were the insurance or financial industry, 24 or 2.7% were technical professionals or scientists, 40 or 4.4% were in education and 42 or 4.7% were in health care.

, there were 224 workers who commuted into the municipality and 211 workers who commuted away.  The municipality is a net importer of workers, with about 1.1 workers entering the municipality for every one leaving. Of the working population, 9.7% used public transportation to get to work, and 38.1% used a private car.

Adelboden has an unemployment rate of 1.8%.  , there were 366 people employed in the primary economic sector and about 143 businesses involved in this sector.  601 people are employed in the secondary sector and there are 57 businesses in this sector.  1098 people are employed in the tertiary sector, with 153 businesses in this sector.

Religion

Of the rest of the population, there were 37 members of an Orthodox church (or about 1.02% of the population), there was 1 individual who belongs to the Christian Catholic Church, and there were 1,173 individuals (or about 32.28% of the population) who belonged to another Christian church. There was 1 individual who was Jewish, and 69 (or about 1.90% of the population) who were Islamic. There was 1 person who was Buddhist and 4 individuals who belonged to another church.  72 (or about 1.98% of the population) belonged to no church, are agnostic or atheist, and 234 individuals (or about 6.44% of the population) did not answer the question.

Tourism and sport

Tourism in Adelboden is family-oriented and accommodations include 24 hotels (1,291 beds), 3,800 vacation homes (15,200 beds), 28 group accommodations (1,830 beds), three camp sites, and 40 restaurants.

Numerous mountain railways lead up to the mountains. Additional activities are: numerous mountain bike routes; and model aircraft construction on Hahnenmoospass with a workshop, and wind and landing opportunities.

In the winter, Adelboden has ski runs of all degrees of difficulty, including the World Cup giant slalom run on the Chuenisbärgli, and cross-country ski trails. For snowboarders there are freeride and freestyle runs.

Adelboden's giant slalom and slalom races are considered classic events on the World Cup circuit and are scheduled for 7–8 January in 2017.

In recent years, the story of a mythical medicine woman named Vogellisi has increasingly been adopted as the symbol or mascot for a variety of touristic activities and souvenirs.

Climate
According to the Köppen Climate Classification system, Adelboden has a Marine West Coast Climate, abbreviated "Cfb" on climate maps with mild, rainy summers with cool nights and long, moderately cold and very snowy winters. Sunshine peaks during summertime though Adelboden is very cloudy year round, especially during winter.

Transportation

Adelboden has only one incoming road connecting from Frutigen which connects via Spiez to the A6 and Bern. There is no transit traffic.

Frutigen is a train station of the Lötschberg line, connecting to Bern and Brig; it is connected to Adelboden by regular post bus services.

The Bunderchrinde Pass connects Adelboden to Kandersteg to the east, whilst the Hahnenmoos Pass provides a connection into the valley of Lenk to the west. There is an old mountain pass route via Engstligenalp and Chindbetti Pass to the Gemmi Pass and into the Valais. None of these passes carries roads, although they were used as trade routes in the past. Today, the Bunderchrinde and Hahnenmoos passes form part of the Alpine Pass Route, a long-distance hiking trail across Switzerland between Sargans and Montreux that passes through the village.

Education
In Adelboden about 1,452 or (40.0%) of the population have completed non-mandatory upper secondary education, and 240 or (6.6%) have completed additional higher education (either university or a Fachhochschule).  Of the 240 who completed tertiary schooling, 71.3% were Swiss men, 21.3% were Swiss women, 4.2% were non-Swiss men and 3.3% were non-Swiss women.

The Canton of Bern school system provides one year of non-obligatory Kindergarten, followed by six years of Primary school.  This is followed by three years of obligatory lower Secondary school where the students are separated according to ability and aptitude.  Following the lower Secondary students may attend additional schooling or they may enter an apprenticeship.

During the 2010–11 school year, there were a total of 447 students attending classes in Adelboden.  There were 4 kindergarten classes with a total of 56 students in the municipality.  Of the kindergarten students, 7.1% were permanent or temporary residents of Switzerland (not citizens) and 12.5% have a different mother language than the classroom language.  The municipality had 13 primary classes and 245 students.  Of the primary students, 4.9% were permanent or temporary residents of Switzerland (not citizens) and 4.5% have a different mother language than the classroom language.  During the same year, there were 7 lower secondary classes with a total of 146 students.  There were 3.4% who were permanent or temporary residents of Switzerland (not citizens) and 4.1% have a different mother language than the classroom language.

, there was one student in Adelboden who came from another municipality, while 52 residents attended schools outside the municipality.

Adelboden is home to the Gemeindebibliothek Adelboden (municipal library of Adelboden).  The library has books or other media, and loaned out items in the same year.  It was open a total of 0 days with average of 0 hours per week during that year.

In Adelboden there is a primary school, middle-school and a secondary school; the nearest special secondary school is in Frutigen.

Schools in Adelboden: There are four primary schools officially in the Adelboden school district, three middle schools (Realschule), and a secondary school (Sekundarschule). The nearest special secondary school is 20 minutes down the mountain in Frutigen and the nearest high schools (Gymnasiums) are in Thun and Interlaken.

Notable people
A number of notable persons in cross-country skiing, mountaineering, and alpine skiing were born in Adelboden:
 Rolf Zurbrügg, Swiss national ski mountain trainer
 Frieda Dänzer, former Alpine skier and 1958 world champion
 Annerösli Zryd, 1970 world champion in Alpine skiing
 Marlies Oester, former alpine skier who competed in the 2002 Winter Olympics.

Italian/British writer Rafael Sabatini died in Abelboden and is buried there.

See also
History of skiing

External links

Adelboden tourism 
Adelboden tourism 
Alpine Ski Maps.com – winter map – Adelboden

References

 
Municipalities of the canton of Bern
Ski areas and resorts in Switzerland
Articles which contain graphical timelines